David "Davy" Crockett (August 17, 1786 – March 6, 1836) was a 19th-century American folk hero, frontiersman, soldier and politician, who died at the Battle of the Alamo.

Crockett was born in Limestone, Greene County, Tennessee, (at that time, part of North Carolina). He served in the militia of Lawrence County, Tennessee and was elected to the Tennessee state legislature in 1821. In 1827, he was elected to the U.S. Congress. Due to his opposition to the Indian Removal Act during the administration of President Andrew Jackson, he was defeated in the next election, but made a political comeback in 1833. He subsequently lost his 1835 re-election bid and angrily left Tennessee for Texas (then the Mexican state of Tejas). His wife and children remained behind in Tennessee.

All that is certain about Crockett's death, is that he died at the Battle of the Alamo.  A former American slave named Ben, who was a cook for one of Santa Anna's officers, maintained that Crockett's body was found in the barracks surrounded by "no less than sixteen Mexican corpses", with Crockett's knife buried in one of them. Stories  that Crockett was among a group who surrendered, and were subsequently executed, began circulating immediately after the tragedy.  His life and legacy have been written about extensively, beginning in 1834 with a biography reputed to have been written by Crockett himself, but in reality was at least partly ghost written by Thomas Chilton.

Bibliography

Bibliography
 
 . Reprint. Originally published: New York: McGraw-Hill, 1958

References

External links

Bibliographies of people
History of Texas
History of Tennessee
Bibliography
Davy Crockett